Edmund Hodgson Smart (1873–1942) was a nineteenth and twentieth-century British painter most noted for his portraits of world leaders.  He was born in Alnwick, England.  He studied art at the Antwerp Academy in Belgium, at the Académie Julian in Paris, and under Sir Hubert von Herkomer in England.

His painting Dawn (1907) was given to the Smithsonian Institution by the artist and is in their public collection.

Select works 

, 1907 
King Edward VII of Britain
Queen Alexandra of Britain
American President 
Marshal Foch
General Pershing
Admiral William Sims
Annie Besant, 1927
Manly Palmer Hall, Philosophical Research Society collection

References 

1873 births
1942 deaths
19th-century English painters
English male painters
20th-century English painters
19th-century English male artists
20th-century English male artists